Vladimir Olegovich Rakhmanin (born 1958) became FAO Assistant Director-General and Regional Representative for Europe and Central Asia in January 2014.  Russian by nationality, Rakhmanin completed a Master's diploma in international relations from Moscow State Institute of International Relations in 1980. Rakhmanin has enjoyed a distinguished career in the Russian civil service, including appointments as the Spokesman for the Ministry of Foreign Affairs (1998–2000), Chief of Protocol of the President of the Russian Federation (2000–2002), and Ambassador of the Russian Federation to Ireland (2002–2006). From 2008 until joining FAO, Rakhmanin served as Deputy Secretary General of the Energy Charter Secretariat in Brussels.

Before becoming Deputy Secretary General, Vladimir Rakhmanin was Ambassador at Large in the Ministry of Foreign Affairs of the Russian Federation, chairing the Working Group on the Mechanism of Peace and Security in Northeast Asia of the Six-Party Talks on Denuclearisation of the Korean Peninsula.

Throughout his career, Rakhmanin was involved in policy-related issues at the national and international level.

Rakhmanin speaks Russian, English and Chinese. He is married and has two sons and a daughter.

Career with the Russian Civil Service

 1980–1982   Attaché, First Far East Department, Ministry of Foreign Affairs of the USSR, Moscow
 1982–1983   Third Secretary, Embassy of the Soviet Union in the People’s Republic of China, Beijing
 1983–1986   Third Secretary, Embassy of the Soviet Union in the United States of America, Washington D.C.
 1986–1992   Head of Secretariat of Deputy Foreign Minister of the USSR (Asia-Pacific Region), Moscow
 1992–1996   Political Counsellor, Embassy of the Russian Federation in the United States of America, Washington D.C.
 1996–1998   Deputy Director, First Asia Department, Ministry of Foreign Affairs of the Russian Federation
   (relations with China, Republic of Korea, DPRK, Northeast Asia Security issues), Moscow
 1998–2000   Director, Information and Press Department, Ministry of Foreign Affairs of the Russian Federation, Moscow
 2000–2002   Chief of Protocol of the President of the Russian Federation, Moscow
 2002–2006   Ambassador of the Russian Federation in Ireland, Dublin
 2007–2008   Ambassador-at-Large, Ministry of Foreign Affairs of the Russian Federation, Moscow
 July 2008-   Deputy Secretary General, Energy Charter Secretariat, Brussels
 January 2014 - Assistant Director-General and Regional Representative for Europe and Central Asia, Food and Agriculture Organization of the United Nations (FAO), Budapest, Hungary

External links
 Energy Charter website - Deputy Secretary General's page
 http://www.fao.org/europe/en/

Russian diplomats
1958 births
Living people
1st class Active State Councillors of the Russian Federation
Ambassadors of Russia to Ireland